The 2013 Credit Agricole Friuladria Tennis Cup was a professional tennis tournament played on clay courts. It was the tenth edition of the tournament which was part of the 2013 ATP Challenger Tour. It took place in Cordenons, Italy between 12 and 18 August 2013.

Singles main draw entrants

Seeds

 1 Rankings are as of August 5, 2013.

Other entrants
The following players received wildcards into the singles main draw:
  Gianluigi Quinzi
  Stefano Napolitano
  Adelchi Virgili
  Filippo Baldi

The following players received entry from the qualifying draw:
  Salvatore Caruso
  Erik Crepaldi
  Mate Delić
  Janez Semrajc

Champions

Singles

  Pablo Carreño Busta def.  Grégoire Burquier 6–4, 6–4

Doubles

 Marin Draganja /  Franko Škugor def.  Norbert Gombos /  Roman Jebavý 6–4, 6–4

External links
Official Website

Credit Agricole Friuladria Tennis Cup
Internazionali di Tennis del Friuli Venezia Giulia
Zucchetti